Soroka is a gender-neutral surname derived from the East Slavic term for a magpie. Alternative forms include Saroka, Soroko and Sorokko. It is a cognate of the Polish surname Sroka, Czech/Slovak Straka, and Slovene Sraka.

People
Alex Soroka (born 2001), Irish rugby union player
 Bohdan Soroka (1940–2015), Ukrainian graphic artist
 Denys Soroka (born 2001), Ukrainian footballer
 Gerald Soroka (born 1968), Canadian politician
 Grigory Soroka (1823–1864), Russian painter
 Igor Soroka (born 1991), Russian handball player
 Ivan Soroka (born 1994), Ukrainian-Irish rugby player
 Mike Soroka (born 1997), Canadian baseball player
 Stefan Soroka (born 1951), Canadian prelate of the Ukrainian Greek Catholic Church
 Teresa Soroka (born 1960), Polish rower
 Volodymyr Soroka (born 1982), Ukrainian judoka
 Wacław W. Soroka (1917–1999), Polish-American historian

Saroka and Soroko 
 Anton Saroka (born 1992), Belarusian football player
 Soroko (surname)

See also
 
 Soroka Medical Center
 Sorokin, Russian surname

Ukrainian-language surnames
Surnames from nicknames